Borovitsa or Borowica (cyrillic ) is the name of several places in Slavic countries:

Bulgaria
 Borovitsa, Kardzhali Province, a village
 Borovitsa, Vidin Province, a village
 , tributary of the Arda
 , touristic mountain hostel on Kardzhali Reservoir, named after the river
 , Kardzhali Province, on the Borovitsa river

Poland
 Borowica, Lower Silesian Voivodeship (south-west Poland)
 Borowica, Lublin Voivodeship (east Poland)

Russia
 , village in Luzsky District, Kirov oblast
 , village in Murashinsky District, Kirov oblast
 , village in Slobodskoy District, Kirov oblast
 Borovitsa, Nizhny Novgorod Oblast, village in Borsky District, Nizhny Novgorod oblast
 , village in Usvyatsky District, Pskov oblast
 , tributary of Voronezh River
 , tributary of Kubena River

Ukraine
 , village in Korosten Raion, Zhytomyr Oblast
 , village in Cherkasy Raion, Cherkasy Oblast

See also 
 Borovica (disambiguation), Serbo-Croatian toponym
 Borovichi, a city in Russia
 Borovička, a juniper brandy from Slovakia
 Boroviće (disambiguation)
 Borowitz (disambiguation)